Elisabeth of France or Elisabeth of Valois (2 April 1545 – 3 October 1568) was Queen of Spain as the third spouse of Philip II of Spain. She was the eldest daughter of Henry II of France and Catherine de' Medici.

Early life

Elisabeth was born in the Château de Fontainebleau. She was raised under the supervision of the governor and governess of the royal children, Jean d'Humières and Françoise d'Humières. 

Elisabeth's childhood was spent in the French royal nursery, where her father insisted she share her bedroom with her future sister-in-law, Mary, Queen of Scots, who was about three years older. Although Elisabeth had to give precedence to Mary (since Mary was already a crowned queen), the two would remain close friends for the rest of their lives. 

Her lady-in-waiting, Claude de Vineulx, accompanied her to Spain and often wrote reports of Elisabeth's health to Catherine. She was described as being shy, timid and very much in awe of her formidable mother, even as there is evidence in letters that Catherine was tender and loving towards her. While it is acknowledged that her sister Margaret and her future sister-in-law Mary were both prettier than she, Elisabeth was nevertheless still considered one of Catherine's attractive daughters. 

In 1550, Elisabeth's father, Henry, began negotiations for her marriage to Edward VI of England. This arrangement brought condemnation from Pope Julius III who reportedly stated that he would excommunicate both if they married. Henry, undeterred, agreed to a dowry of 200,000 ecus, which became irrelevant upon Edward's death in 1553.

Queen of Spain

Elisabeth married Philip II of Spain in 1559. Originally married via proxy at Notre Dame (with the Duke of Alba standing in for Philip) prior to leaving France, the actual ceremony took place in Guadalajara, Spain, upon her arrival. The marriage was a result of the Peace of Cateau Cambrésis (1559). His second wife, Mary I of England, had recently died, making Elisabeth of Valois Philip's third wife.

Elisabeth left France dressed as a "daughter of France" and arrived in Spain transformed with her 16 French ladies costumed in the Spanish style. At her wedding she met the painter Sofonisba Anguissola, and Ana de Mendoza, who would live with her the rest of her life. Philip II appointed Anguissola to be a lady-in-waiting and court painter for his queen. Under Anguissola's tutelage, Elisabeth improved her amateur painting skills. Anguissola also influenced the artistic works of her children, Isabella Clara Eugenia and Caterina Michaela, during her time at the court.

Philip was completely enchanted by his 14-year-old bride, and by 1564 had given up his infidelities. Despite the significant age difference, Elisabeth was also quite pleased with her husband. (In letters to her mother, she proclaimed herself to be fortunate to have married so charming a prince.) Philip enjoyed hosting chivalric tournaments to entertain his wife.  Elisabeth would play liege lady to the three young princes of the Spanish Court: Carlos, Prince of Asturias, John of Austria (illegitimate son of Charles V), and Alexander Farnese, Duke of Parma (son of Charles V's illegitimate daughter Margaret).

Elisabeth had originally been betrothed to Philip's son, Carlos, Prince of Asturias, but political complications unexpectedly necessitated instead a marriage to Philip. Her relationship with her troubled stepson Carlos was warm and friendly. Despite reports of his progressively bizarre behavior, Carlos was always kind and gentle to Elisabeth.  When it eventually became necessary for Philip to lock him away (which shortly led to the Prince's demise), Elisabeth cried for days.

Philip was very attached to Elisabeth, staying close by her side even when she was ill with smallpox. Elisabeth's first pregnancy in 1560 resulted in a stillborn son, followed in 1564 with a miscarriage of twin girls. She later gave birth to Infanta Isabella Clara Eugenia of Spain on 12 August 1566, and then to Isabella's younger sister Catherine Michelle of Spain on 10 October 1567. Phillip and Elisabeth were very close to both of their daughters buying them jams, dolls, toys and more. It is said "both rejoiced at the birth of Isabella as if it had been the birth of a son".  Elisabeth had another miscarriage on 3 October 1568, and died the same day, along with her newborn infant daughter.

After the death of Elisabeth, Catherine de' Medici offered her younger daughter Margaret as a bride for Philip. Philip declined the offer.

In fiction

Elisabeth of Valois is a central character in Thomas Otway's play Don Carlos, Prince of Spain; in Schiller's play of the same name;  in Verdi's opera adapted from Schiller's play, also titled Don Carlos; and in several other, less well-known operas. Antonio Buzzolla's version of 1850 is actually named "Elisabetta di Valois". All these works imply a tragic romance between Elisabeth and Carlos, suggesting that they were really in love with each other when Elisabeth was forced to break off her engagement to Carlos and marry his father Philip.

In Madame de Lafayette's novella The Princesse de Cleves, Elisabeth of Valois' marriage to Philip II is the occasion for the wedding games at which her father Henri II dies; her role is brief but it substantially affects the novella's narrative arc.

Elisabeth of Valois is portrayed by Caoimhe O'Malley (in the pilot) on the CW show, Reign, then later by Anastasia Phillips in the fourth season of the show. Rather than the “plain Jane” of her family the character is portrayed as beautiful and her timid and shy personality is changed to that of one more forceful, cold, insensitive and quite controlling which is driven out of her legitimate desire for her mother's affections. Her name Elisabeth is spelled with an S instead of a Z though in the fourth season she is simply called Leeza as not to be confused with Queen Elizabeth I. In the first episode, Leeza is married to King Philip of Spain, leaves for Spain with her husband without speaking any lines, and isn't physically seen until fourth season of the show. Though not seen until the fourth season, she is mentioned as a possible option for god-mother to her King Francis' (her brother's) son John in the second season. In the third season, her kingdom is chosen as a safe haven for her younger sisters and brothers after a group calling themselves "The Red Knights" threaten revenge on the Valois family. Making her physical return to the show, she is one of the four Queens (Queen Mary, Queen Elizabeth I and her mother, regent Queen Catherine) to be featured during the season. During her appearance, she spends time in French court as an envoy of Spain and voice of her husband's wishes as well rival for her mother.

Elisabeth of Valois is a major character in The Creation of Eve, a novel by Lynn Cullen based on the history of Sofonisba Anguissola, the first renowned female artist of the Italian Renaissance. In the novel, Sofonisba is the painting tutor and premier lady-in-waiting for young Queen Elisabeth.

Notes

References

Sources 
 

 

 

 

|-

People from Fontainebleau
1545 births
1568 deaths
Elisabeth of Valois
Spanish royal consorts
Royal consorts of Naples
Royal consorts of Sicily
Elisabeth of Valois
Deaths in childbirth
Burials in the Pantheon of Infantes at El Escorial
Wives of Philip II of Spain
16th-century Spanish women
16th-century French women
16th-century Spanish people
16th-century French people
Sofonisba Anguissola
Daughters of kings
Women who experienced pregnancy loss